Immoral Women is a 1979 French erotic drama film directed by Walerian Borowczyk, written by Borowczyk and André Pieyre de Mandiargues and starring Jean-Claude Dreyfus, Marina Pierro and Françoise Quéré.

Synopsis
The film is divided into three self-contained episodes, set in different time periods and featuring female protagonists whose names all start with letter M as in the word mal (evil) and who commit crimes of passion.
 "Margherita", the ambitious mistress of the painter Raphael. Rome, 1520. This episode contains unsimulated sex between Margherita and Tomaso.
 "Marceline", the desirous adolescent daughter of a bourgeois family. Fin de siècle France.
 "Marie", the clever wife of a wealthy gallery owner. Modern day Paris.

Cast
 Marina Pierro as Margherita Luti
 Gaëlle Legrand as Marceline Caïn
 Pascale Christophe as Marie
 François Guétary as Raphael Sanzio
 Jean-Claude Dreyfus as Bini
 Jean Martinelli as Pope
 Pierre Benedetti as Mad Painter
 Philippe Desboeuf as Doctor
 Noël Simsolo as Julio Romano
 Roger Lefrere	as Michelangelo
 Gérard Falconetti as Tomaso
 Hassane Fall as Petrus
 France Rumilly as Madame Cain
 Yves Gourvil as Cain
 Lisbeth Arno as Floka
 Gérard Ismaël	as Antoine
 Henri Piégay as Husband
 Mathieu Rivollier		
 Robert Capia		
 Daniel Marty		
 Jacky Baudet		
 Sylvain Ramsamy		
 Jean Boullu		
 Françoise Quéré		
 Mazouz Ould-Abderrahmane		
 Bernard Hiard

Soundtrack
The score was composed by Philippe d'Aram and Olivier Dassault.

Release
The film premiered on 7 March 1979 in a cinema release.

References

External links 
 
 

1979 films
1970s erotic drama films
French anthology films
French erotic drama films
Films directed by Walerian Borowczyk
1970s French-language films
1979 drama films
1970s French films